is a Japanese actor, voice actor, narrator, and film director. He works at ANDSTIR. Some of his roles as a voice actor include Seto Kaiba in Yu-Gi-Oh!, Sadahara Inui in Shin Tennis no Ouji-sama, Kazama Chikage in Hakuoki, Ryuga in Metal Fight Beyblade, Mikoto Suoh and Gouki Zenjou in K-Project, Fire Emblem in Tiger & Bunny, Hannes in Attack on Titan, Nicolas Brown in Gangsta, Doug Horbat in Juushinki Pandora, Atomic Samurai in One-Punch Man, Overhaul in My Hero Academia, Matoba Kei in Cop Craft, Lero Ro in Tower of God, Shiori Ichinose in Tokunana, Nino in ACCA, Hakuto Kunai in Maou-sama, Retry!, Akihito Narihisago/Sakaido in ID:INVADED, Tsuchigomori in Toilet-Bound Hanako-kun, Manji in Mugen no Juunin, Jigen/Isshiki Otsutsuki in Boruto: Naruto Next Generations, Joker in Fire Force, Kento Nanami in Jujutsu Kaisen, Tatsu in The Way of the Househusband, Dainsleif in Genshin Impact, The Beholder in To Your Eternity, Hans in Konosuba, Almond Cookie in Cookie Run: Kingdom, Zeke in Xenoblade Chronicles 2, Kishibe in Chainsaw Man and Bruford in Jojo's Bizarre Adventure.

Biography

Personality
Tsuda lived in Jakarta until he was seven years old. He is a graduate of Meiji University, where he studied theater literature in the department of literature; originally, he had considered wanting to make films as a movie director, when he also had an interest in the field of performing. At the En • Theater Research Institute, he took and passed a non-degree course, being enthusiastic about theater work.

After his graduation from a trading school, Tsuda had belonged to a theatre group office. In so doing, there was talk of auditions, and Tsuda made his debut in voice acting as Atsushi Noda in the 1995 animated television series "H2." Since then, Tsuda's work has centered around voice acting, as he's worked in theater, television dramas, and movie appearances, among others; furthermore, he has been active at many levels, including as a narrator and radio personality, in television programs, commercials, and the like.

Tsuda likes both filming and watching movies. He began attending movie theaters in junior high; though he had watched old Western movies until senior high and focused on artistic films after entering college, fundamentally his interest lies, evidently, in non-genres.

In 2017, when Keiji Fujiwara was recovering from illness, Tsuda took charge as a substitute actor for a few roles (those of Isami Enomoto in "Space Battleship Yamato 2202: Warriors of Love," Hannes in "Attack on Titan").

On February 2, 2019, Tsuda debuted as a film director with his release of "Documentertainment AD-LIVE" (the term being a portmanteau of "documentary" and "entertainment").

On November 24, 2020, "Actor's Short Film" — a project launched by WOWOW to commemorate the station's 30th year since its opening: Five actors (facing the same conditions, such as budget and time) would individually direct short films up to 25 minutes long each; one of those five films will be chosen, based on the votes of viewers and film critics, to be presented at the Short Shorts Film Festival & Asia held in 2021 — was announced on Twitter; Tsuda took part with his own short film, "GET SET GO," which cast actors Ryou Ryuusei and Shunsuke Daitou. As the film's director and screenwriter, Tsuda also made an appearance in the film as an actor. On January 13, 2021, distribution of these five films began.

Episode 
Tsuda revealed on his Twitter that he has been called "Kenbou" (literally, "Ken Sonny," which is actually a pet form based on his given name's meaning, "Healthy Second Son") by, among others, game designer Hideo Kojima and voice actor Akio Ōtsuka — working for the general manager — at the recording location of the game "Death Stranding." Several days later, in the form of a reply Tweeted to Tsuda, voice actor Akihiko Ishizumi, who had been with the actor at the same game recording location, wrote "Kenbou."

Personal life 
Tsuda married a woman he encountered around when he was starting out as a stage actor (she is not a celebrity, as Tsuda mentioned it in his Instagram announcement), and currently is the father of two children. By not officially announcing his marriage, Tsuda thought, he could protect his family's safety; another reason for this approach is the large appeal that Tsuda's favorite actors have carried as figures who have not displayed their private lives — he, too, had thoughts of wanting to become an expressive person like that, so he hadn't made his getting married public. However, in July 2020, he received notice that a news story about his marriage had been published in one section of a weekly magazine (Shūkanshi) and decided to bring these facts to light via his Instagram.

Appearances
Boldface indicates main characters.

Television Animation

Animation in Theatres

Original Net Animation (ONA)

Original Video Animation (OVA)

Dubbing

Actors in Charge of

Movies

Dramas

Animation

Stage (Theatre)

Television dramas

Movies

Original Videos

Games

Drama CDs

Digital Comics

Tokusatsu

Narration

Commercials (CMs)

Radio

Footage Products

Publications

That Other Content

Discography

Character Songs

Footnotes

Annotation

Unit Members

References

External links
Official website 
Official Twitter (@tsuda_ken) (in Japanese)
Official Instagram (@2_da_ken) (in Japanese)
 

1971 births
20th-century Japanese male actors
21st-century Japanese male actors
Best Actor Seiyu Award winners
Japanese male musical theatre actors
Japanese male video game actors
Japanese male voice actors
Living people
Male voice actors from Osaka Prefecture
Seiyu Award winners
Stardust Promotion artists